Wayne Easter  (born June 22, 1949) is a former Canadian politician who represented the riding of Malpeque, Prince Edward Island from 1993 to 2021.

Before politics
Born in North Wiltshire, Prince Edward Island, the son of A. Leith Easter and Hope MacLeod, he was educated at the Charlottetown Rural High School and the Nova Scotia Agricultural College. Easter received an honorary doctorate of law  from University of Prince Edward Island in 1988 for his work and contribution to agriculture and social activism on a national and international level. He was awarded the Governor General's Canada 125 Medal in 1992 for community service. In 1970, he married Helen Arleighn Laird. Easter operates a dairy, beef and grain farm near North Wiltshire. He is a former president of the National Farmers Union.

Wayne and his wife Helen live in North Wiltshire and have two grown children.

Federal politics
Easter served as a member of the Liberal Party of Canada in the House of Commons of Canada, representing the electoral district of Malpeque in the province of Prince Edward Island from 1993 to 2021.

Easter entered federal politics in 1993 when he was elected as the Member of Parliament for the riding of Malpeque, P.E.I. He was re-elected in 1997, 2000, 2004, 2006, 2008, 2011, 2015, and 2019.

He served in Prime Minister Jean Chrétien's Cabinet as Solicitor General of Canada from 2002–2003. He also served as Parliamentary Secretary to the Minister of Fisheries and Oceans  from 1997–1999, and to the Minister of Agriculture and Agri-Food, with a special emphasis on rural development from 2004–2006.

From 2006 to 2014, Easter has served several critic roles. He was the critic for Agriculture and Agri-Food and the Canadian Wheat Board from 2006–2011, International Trade from 2011–2013, and  Liberal Party critic for Public Safety from 2013–2015.

Easter held the position of Co-Chair for the Canada- U.S. Inter-Parliamentary Association, and also held the position of Chair for the Government of Canada Legislators Finance Committee.

Electoral record

References

External links
 Official site

1949 births
Canadian critics of Islam
Liberal Party of Canada MPs
Living people
Members of the 26th Canadian Ministry
Members of the House of Commons of Canada from Prince Edward Island
Members of the King's Privy Council for Canada
Members of the United Church of Canada
Nova Scotia Agricultural College alumni
People from Queens County, Prince Edward Island
Solicitors General of Canada